The Carpenter's Pencil is a 2003 Spanish war drama film directed by Antón Reixa, scored by Antón Seoane and starring Tristán Ulloa, Luis Tosar and María Adánez. It is set in the Spanish Civil War in Galicia, Spain. It is based on the homonym novel by Manuel Rivas; the director read the novel at least seventy eight times.

The film got 171,325 spectators and was described as well-meaning and Manichean. Luis Tosar said that his part in this film was the most difficult role he has portrayed.

Cast

See also 
 List of Spanish films of 2003

References

External links
 

Spanish war drama films
2000s war drama films
2003 drama films
2003 films
Spanish Civil War films
Films based on Spanish novels
Films shot in Spain
Films set in Galicia (Spain)
Films scored by Lucio Godoy
Morena Films films
Sogecine films
2000s Spanish films
2000s Spanish-language films